Kalina Górecka  is a village in the administrative district of Gmina Pierzchnica, within Kielce County, Świętokrzyskie Voivodeship, in south-central Poland.

References

Villages in Kielce County